The USS Araner (IX-226) was laid down as the liberty ship Juan de Fuca under a Maritime Commission contract (MCE hull 1747) on 15 November 1942 at Vancouver, Washington, by the Oregon Shipbuilding Company and launched on 27 December 1942. The ship was delivered to the War Shipping Administration (WSA) on 11 January 1943 and immediately placed under a standard WSA operating agreement with Weyerhauser Steamship Company.

While during service in the Atlantic and Mediterranean she came under fire at least once, on 4 October 1943, and was credited with downing two attacking aircraft and assisting in driving off the remaining planes. During the Battle of Mindoro she was torpedoed and damaged by a Japanese aircraft, without casualties, in the South China Sea 20 miles off Mindoro, Philippines. She was beached on Ambulong Island. She was refloated and towed to Subic Bay. On 30 December 1944 the ship was declared a total constructive loss. Later repaired the ship entered United States Navy service under bareboat charter from WSA as USS Araner (IX-226) on 23 September 1945 and placed in service that same day.

Araner appears to have contributed very little service to the United States Navy. She was inspected by an inspection and survey board at Leyte during October, the month following the beginning of her naval service. In January 1946, probably as a result of that inspection, she received orders to be towed to Subic Bay where all her naval gear was stripped pending her deactivation. On 22 August 1946, she was placed out of service at Subic Bay and simultaneously turned over to the Maritime Commission's War Shipping Administration for disposal. That organization finally sold her along with fourteen other vessels to the Asia Development Corporation, Shanghai on 29 January 1948 for scrapping. Her name was struck from the Navy list on 29 October 1948.

Footnotes

References

Sources

Liberty ships
World War II auxiliary ships of the United States
Araner
1942 ships
Maritime incidents in December 1944